Below are lists of castles in Europe, organized by country:

Sovereign states

List of castles in Albania
List of castles in Andorra
List of castles in Armenia
List of castles in Austria
List of castles and fortresses in Azerbaijan
List of castles in Belarus
List of castles in Belgium
List of castles in Bosnia and Herzegovina
List of castles in Bulgaria
List of castles in Croatia
List of castles in Cyprus
List of castles in Czech Republic
List of castles and palaces in Denmark 
List of castles in Estonia
List of castles in Finland
List of castles in France
List of castles in Georgia
List of castles in Germany
List of castles in Greece
List of castles in Hungary
List of castles in Iceland
List of castles in the Republic of Ireland
List of castles in Italy
List of castles in Latvia
List of castles in Liechtenstein
List of castles in Lithuania
List of castles in Luxembourg
List of castles in Malta
List of castles in Moldova
List of castles in Monaco
List of castles in Montenegro
List of castles in the Netherlands
List of castles in North Macedonia
List of castles in Norway
List of castles in Poland
List of castles in Portugal
List of castles in Romania
List of castles in Russia
List of castles in San Marino
List of castles in Serbia
List of castles in Slovakia
List of castles in Slovenia
List of castles in Spain
List of castles in Sweden
List of castles and fortresses in Switzerland
List of castles in Turkey
List of castles in Ukraine
Castles in the United Kingdom
List of castles in England
List of castles in the Isle of Man
List of castles in Northern Ireland
List of castles in Scotland
List of castles in Wales

States with limited recognition and dependencies
List of castles in Abkhazia
List of castles in the Channel Islands
Gibraltar
List of castles in Kosovo
List of forts in Artsakh
List of castles in Northern Cyprus
List of castles in South Ossetia
List of castles in Transnistria

See also
Lists of castles around the world
List of Crusader castles
List of fortifications
List of forts
List of palaces